The 2013 FIBA Oceania Championship for Women was the 15th edition of the tournament. The tournament featured a two-game series between Australia and New Zealand between 14 and 18 August. Game one was held in Auckland, New Zealand followed by the second game in Canberra, Australia.

Rosters 

|}
| valign="top" |
 Head coach

 Assistant coach(es)

Legend
Club – describes lastclub before the tournament
Age – describes ageon 14 August 2013
|}

|}
| valign="top" |
 Head coach

 Assistant coach(es)

Legend
(C) Team captain
Club – describes lastclub before the tournament
Age – describes ageon 14 August 2013
|}

Results 

|}

All times are local (UTC+12).

Game 1

Game 2

References 

2013
2013 in women's basketball
2013 in New Zealand basketball
Women
2013–14 in Australian basketball
International women's basketball competitions hosted by Australia
International basketball competitions hosted by New Zealand
Australia women's national basketball team games
New Zealand women's national basketball team games
2013 in Australian women's sport
basketball